The 1976–77 Birmingham Bulls season was the Bulls' first season of operation in Birmingham, Alabama after the Toronto Toros relocated from Toronto, Ontario, Canada.

Offseason

Regular season

Final standings

Game log

Player stats

Note: Pos = Position; GP = Games played; G = Goals; A = Assists; Pts = Points; +/- = plus/minus; PIM = Penalty minutes; PPG = Power-play goals; SHG = Short-handed goals; GWG = Game-winning goals
      MIN = Minutes played; W = Wins; L = Losses; T = Ties; GA = Goals-against; GAA = Goals-against average; SO = Shutouts;

Awards and records

Transactions

Draft picks
Birmingham's draft picks (selected while still known as the Toronto Toros) at the 1976 WHA Amateur Draft.

Farm teams

See also
1976–77 WHA season

References

External links

Birm
Birm
Birmingham Bulls seasons